Samad  or Samed (Ṣamad) is an Arabic male given name.

Given name
Samad bey Mehmandarov (born 1855), Azerbaijani General
Samed Abdul Awudu (born 1984), Ghanaian football player
Samad Nikkhah Bahrami (born 1983), Iranian basketball player
Samad Behrangi (1939–1967), Iranian teacher, folklorist and writer
Samad Marfavi (born 1965), Iranian football player
Samad bey Mehmandarov (1855–1931), Azerbaijani-Russian general
Samad Rustamov, Uzbek Sambo player
Samad Khan Momtaz os-Saltaneh (1869–1955), Iranian diplomat
Samad Shohzukhurov (born 1990), Tajik football player
Samad Taylor, American baseball player
Samad Vurgun (1906–1956), Azerbaijani-Soviet poet
Samed Yeşil (born 1994), Turkish-German football player

Middle name
 Abdul Samad Ismail (1924–2008), Malaysian journalist
 Abdul Samad Rabiu (born 1960), Nigerian businessman
 Abdul Samad of Selangor (1804–1898), Sultan of Selangor

Surname
Abdul Basit 'Abd us-Samad 1927–1988), Egyptian Quran reciter
Abdus Samad Azad (1922–2005), Bangladeshi diplomat and politician
Hamed Abdel-Samad (born 1972), German-Egyptian writer
Mohammad Samad (born 2000), Indian actor
Mohammad Ridzwan bin Samad, a convicted rioter and gang member of Salakau in Singapore
Nabil Samad (born 1986), Bangladeshi cricketer
Omar Samad, Afghan diplomat
Sahal Abdul Samad (born 1997), Indian football player
Saleh Ali al-Sammad (1979–2018), Yemeni politician
Ziad Al-Samad (born 1978), Lebanese football player

In fiction
Samad, a character played by Ameet Chana in the British web series Corner Shop Show.
Samad, a fictional character played by Iranian actor Parviz Sayyad.
Samad Iqbal, a main character in the novel White Teeth by Zadie Smith.

Arabic-language surnames
Masculine given names